The Roland MKS-20 is a digital piano-type sound module released by Roland Corporation in 1986. It is a rackmount version of the popular 1980s-era Roland RD-1000 digital piano. The RD-1000 has the exact same sound engine mounted in a  musical keyboard-type MIDI controller. Both use Roland's "structured adaptive synthesis approach" to provide eight keyboard sounds, including grand piano, electric piano, harpsichord, vibraphone, and clavinet. Both have three effects units built in: stereo chorus, stereo tremolo, and a three-band equalizer with a sweepable mid-range.

Features

MKS-20 rack unit
Roland's structured adaptive synthesis (SAS) has been explained as a "...sophisticated re-synthesis technique which involves a highly accurate computer analysis of 'real' sounds, from which a near replica can be synthesised." Roland engineers did samples of each of the 88 notes of various grand pianos at many different velocities (i.e. everything from very soft to very loud), and then did analysis of the waveform changes. The resulting algorithm of harmonic/velocity sound relationships was put on a VLSI chip.

The MKS-20 has 16-voice polyphony, which means that 16 keys can be pressed at the same time. It has eight presets for piano and other keyboard instruments (electric piano, harpsichord, vibraphone, clavinet), with 56 variations. The first two piano sounds have been likened to a German grand piano sound; the third has been called similar to a Yamaha CP-70 or CP80's piano sound. The unit responds to velocity (hard or soft playing) when a MIDI controller keyboard that outputs velocity data is connected to it. The MKS-20 has a "voice preserve" feature which can be turned on or off. When voice preserve is on, the player can play a note or chord, and then while holding the notes down on the keyboard, switch to a new synth voice. Even though a new synth voice was selected, the original voice is sustained as long as the player holds down the original note or chord. Subsequent notes or chords use the newly selected voice.

It has three onboard effects units: stereo chorus effect with adjustable rate and depth, stereo tremolo with adjustable rate and depth, and equalizer. The three-band equalizer has bass (100 Hz) and treble (10 kHz) shelving controls and a parametric midrange control. The front panel has sliders, buttons, an alpha-dial for changing settings, a headphone jack, a port for plugging in a M-16C memory cartridge, and a MIDI message light, which flashes when the unit is sending it receiving MIDI messages. The back has 5-pin MIDI "in" and "out" ports for connecting to a MIDI controller or to other MIDI gear (e.g., a music sequencer) and stereo 1/4" (600 ohm) and XLR outputs for plugging into a keyboard amplifier, PA system, or recording system.

The back also has a three-position output level switch which only affects the unbalanced 1/4 outputs. The high level output is for recording applications. The low or medium level are for guitar amplifiers. The medium or high level are for keyboard amplifiers. When connecting the unit to an audio mixer, either three of the level settings can be used. It weighs 8 kg (17 lb 10oz) and uses the standard 19" rack size. The MKS-20 uses CEM3360 dual voltage controlled amplifier (VCA) integrated circuit chips. Inside the unit, there is a battery to power the memory unit. The battery needs to be replaced every five years by a qualified repair technician.

RD-1000 keyboard
The RD-1000 has the same electronics and sound features as the MKS-20 mounted in an 88-note weighted MIDI controller keyboard, along with a keyboard stand and a floor unit to house the sustain pedal and a soft pedal.
 The keyboard alone is 95 pounds; the floor pedal unit is 18 pounds, and the heavy duty stand is another 29 to 39 pounds, depending on which stand model you have. The settings offer keyboard touch response changes, which are called A, B, C and D. "B is the default value, under which the shift in dynamics and harmonic structure increases in a linear way with the amount of velocity applied to a key." With setting A, there is a more subtle increase in volume and less change of timbre. With the settings C and D, the changes are more dramatic.

History and reception

When Roland introduced the structured adaptive synthesis system, Sound on Sound says musicians viewed it as a "revelation". In 1986, pianists seeking a digital piano sound often used sampled pianos. While an individual note on a sampled piano might sound realistic, the samples might not include different dynamics and articulations. The MKS-20 offered "...more than 30 keyboard 'zones' differentiated not just by pitch and brightness, but also by individual formant structures and string enharmonicities", creating a piano sound that was "...far superior to any straightforward sample-replay system" available in 1986. Musicians found that they could "...recreate acoustic and electronic pianos on a range of stage instruments".

Digital instrument versions

In 2016, Fait Clic released a Windows-based Virtual Studio Technology (VST) recreation of the MKS-20, called MKS-20Vst for Windows. The program has a graphical user interface (GUI) which resembles the MKS-20's front panel. It also recreates Roland's chorus effect, the SDD 320 (also called "Dimension D" chorus).

In 2017, VGSG Music released a digital version called iKS20 that makes MKS-20's sounds available on Yamaha's MOXF, MOTIF XF, MONTAGE and MODX synthesizers. These Yamaha keyboards need a 1GB USB flash drive to load the iKS20 file. Additional requirements include the installation of the Yamaha FL1024M 1GB Flash Expansion Board for the MOXF and MOTIF XF. And 1GB of free space for the MONTAGE and MODX's onboard Flash RAM.

Keyscape's Collector Keyboards, a virtual instrument, includes a digital recreation of the MKS-20 in its list of over 500 sounds, 36 instrument models and hybrid “duo” patches. The Keyscape virtual instrument uses multisampled sounds and requires 77 GB to download  or the purchase of boxed USB drives. The MKS-20 patch includes controls for effects.

Loot Audio produces a digital version called RP-86. It has two MKS-20-inspired piano sounds, which can be used in Native Instruments' Kontact 5 system. It is not a sample; instead it is a re-synthesis which resembles the original. The MKS-20 sounds are bundled with a number of other 1980s-era sounds.

Notable users
 Tony Banks uses an MKS-20 piano module to duplicate his Yamaha DX7, with chords played on a  Kurzweil 1000PX.
 Thomas Dolby uses the Roland MKS-20 piano module along with a Fairlight Series III and a Roland Super Jupiter synth.
 Elton John was a notable user of both the MKS-20 and the RD-1000 in the late 1980s, featuring heavily on the albums Reg Strikes Back and Sleeping With The Past (the instrument is directly credited on the latter album)
 Mike Lindup from Level 42 uses an MKS-20 alongside a range of other Roland gear.
 Brent Mydland from the Grateful Dead used an MKS-20 as his primary digital piano from 1987-1990, controlled through a Kurzweil Midiboard 
 Paul Sidoti (Taylor Swift)
 Joe Phillips used the MKS-20 for Barney & Friends.
 Annie Hogan used a RD-1000 on Marc Almond The Stars We Are LP.

References

Synthesizers
Piano